Little Women was a BBC television series in 1970, based on the 1868-69 two-volume novel of the same name by Louisa May Alcott. It was the third BBC adaptation of the novel.

It was shown on the Sunday tea-time slot on BBC1, where the BBC often showed fairly faithful adaptations of classic novels aimed at a family audience. It consisted of nine episodes.

It is not one of the better-remembered adaptations of Little Women, possibly because it was made on a relatively low budget and nearly all shot in the studio.  There were also comments about the actresses playing the March sisters being too old for the part, and some of the cast struggling with an American accent.  However it did have some merits e.g. the character of Laurie was more developed than in some versions, and it may have stuck to the original novel more closely than most adaptations e.g. by showing the March sisters often quarreling (this was discussed in the letters page of the Radio Times).

Cast
 Angela Down as Jo March
 Jo Rowbottom as Meg March
 Janina Faye as Amy March
 Stephanie Bidmead as Mrs. March
 Stephen Turner as Laurie
 Martin Jarvis as John Brooke
 Pat Nye as Hannah
 Sarah Craze as Beth March
 John Welsh as  Mr. Laurence
 Jean Anderson as Aunt March
 Patrick Troughton as Mr. March
 Philip Ray as Rodgers
 Frederick Jaeger as Professor Bhaer 
 Brian Badcoe as Doctor
 Beth Ellis as Mrs. Kirke
 Richard Franklin as Jack Scott
 John Rapley as The Editor

References

External links 
 

1970 British television series debuts
1970 British television series endings
1970s British drama television series
English-language television shows
BBC television dramas
Television series about the American Civil War
Television series based on Little Women